"Love is Leaving" is a song by English singer, songwriter, DJ, fashion designer and photographer Boy George. It was written by George and German DJ Mike Koglin, who also produced this track, and released in 1996 as a single only. Becoming a sizeable club hit in Europe, the song peaked at number three in Italy and number 61 on the Eurochart Hot 100 in December 1996. Outside Europe, it was successful in Israel, peaking at number-one in March 1997. The single also charted in Australia, reaching number 70. The accompanying music video for "Love is Leaving" was directed by Ben Unwin and is shot in black-and-white. Larry Flick from Billboard complimented the song as an "anthem", while another editor, Paul Verna, complimented it as a "gem".

Track listing
 12", Italy (1996)
"Love is Leaving" (Alex Natale Remix) – 5:12
"Love is Leaving" (Alex Natale Dub Mix) – 6:55
"Love is Leaving" (Molella Guitar Mix) – 5:24
"Love is Leaving" (Molly Nrg Mix) – 6:44

 12" maxi, Spain (1997)
"Love is Leaving" (The Back Teeth Dub) – 8:28
"Love is Leaving" (The Bleeding Gums Dub) – 6:25
"Love is Leaving" (The Back Teeth Edit) – 4:18

 CD single, Belgium (1997)
"Love is Leaving" (The Milk Teeth Popular Mix) – 3:53
"Love is Leaving" (The Incisor Cut/F. Edit) – 3:25

 CD maxi, Europe (1997)
"Love is Leaving" (The Milk Teeth Popular Mix) – 3:53
"Love is Leaving" (The Original Tooth Fairy) – 3:49
"Love is Leaving" (The Bleeding Gums Dub) – 6:25
"Love is Leaving" (The Back Teeth Dub) – 8:28
"Love is Leaving" (The Incisor Cut) – 5:11
"Love is Leaving" (The Back Teeth Edit) – 4:18

Charts

References

 

1996 singles
1997 singles
1997 songs
Black-and-white music videos
Boy George songs
Electro songs
Electronic songs
House music songs
Music videos directed by Ben Unwin
Number-one singles in Israel
Songs written by Boy George
Trance songs